Papyrus Oxyrhynchus 223 (P. Oxy. 223 or P. Oxy. II 223) is a fragment of Homer's Iliad (E,329-705), written in Greek. It was discovered in Oxyrhynchus. The manuscript was written on papyrus in the form of a roll. It is dated to the third century. Currently it is housed in the Bodleian Library (Ms. Gr. Class. a 8) in Oxford.

Description 
The document was written by an unknown copyist. It contains the text of the fifth book of the Iliad. It is written on the verso side of the Petition of Dionysia. Before it was utilised for the Iliad roll, it had to be patched and strengthened. The original roll was of great length.

The measurements of the fragment are 260 by 2095 mm. The text is written in a bold well formed uncial hand of the square sloping type. The letter xi is formed by three separate strokes. It uses accents, breathings, and marks of elision. There are some errors, typical for Homeric papyri of the Roman period.

The text contains corrections as well.

It was discovered by Grenfell and Hunt in 1897 in Oxyrhynchus. The text was published by Grenfell and Hunt in 1899. The editors collated the text of the codex against La Roche's text (R). They noticed errors of itacism (ει for ι). The number of divergences is not high.

See also 
 Oxyrhynchus Papyri
 Papyrus Oxyrhynchus 221
 Papyrus Oxyrhynchus 224

References 

223
3rd-century manuscripts
Bodleian Library collection
Manuscripts of the Iliad